Paracoryphella parva is a species of sea slug, an aeolid nudibranch, a marine heterobranch mollusc in the family Paracoryphellidae.

Distribution
This species was described from the Øresund, between Denmark and Sweden. It has not been reported since the original description.

References

Paracoryphellidae
Gastropods described in 1963